"The Highways of My Life" is a pop rock-styled ballad written, produced and recorded by American rock band The Isley Brothers, recorded and released in early 1974 as a single off the group's landmark record, 3 + 3.

About the song
The song is about a person wanting to search through the journey of his livelihood while being sure not to go "to the other side of the road". The song is notable for its intro arranged by Chris Jasper, who plays the piano in the intro of the song for a few minutes before the music kicks in. Lead singer Ron Isley sings in his trademark countertenor vocals while he and his vocalizing older brothers Kelly and Rudy Isley helped him in the backgrounds while being accompanied by Jasper, who also plays a synthesizer solo, and younger brothers Ernie, on both acoustic guitar and drums and Marvin on bass guitar.

The song was released as the b-side to the Isleys' modest hit, "What It Comes Down To", though the song attracted UK fans of the group enough to play it. The song eventually charted at number twenty-five in the UK in 1974. The song's intro was later sampled by Fantasia for her hit, "Truth Is".

Credits
Ronald Isley: lead and background vocals
Rudolph Isley and O'Kelly Isley, Jr.: background vocals
Chris Jasper: keyboards, piano and synthesizers
Ernie Isley: acoustic guitar and drums
Marvin Isley: bass guitar

1974 singles
The Isley Brothers songs
Songs written by Chris Jasper
Songs written by Ernie Isley
Songs written by Rudolph Isley
Songs written by O'Kelly Isley Jr.
Songs written by Ronald Isley
Songs written by Marvin Isley
1973 songs
T-Neck Records singles